Edward Lee was an English professional footballer who played as a winger.

References

English footballers
Association football midfielders
Burnley F.C. players
English Football League players
Year of death missing
19th-century births